João Carlos Moura Gradíssimo (born 18 May 1992) is a Portuguese footballer who plays for Académico de Viseu FC as a midfielder.

Football career
On 2 August 2015, Gradíssimo made his professional debut with Académico Viseu in a 2015–16 Taça da Liga match against Gil Vicente.

References

External links

Stats and profile at LPFP 

1992 births
Living people
Portuguese footballers
Association football midfielders
Académico de Viseu F.C. players
Footballers from Porto